The Islamic Republic of Iran Broadcasting (IRIB) formerly called National Iranian Radio and Television until the Iranian revolution of 1979, is an Iranian state-controlled media corporation that holds a monopoly of domestic radio and television services in Iran. It is also among the largest media organizations in Asia and the Pacific region and a regular member of the Asia-Pacific Broadcasting Union. Its head is appointed directly by the Supreme Leader, Ayatollah Ali Khamenei.

With 13,000 employees and branches in 20 countries worldwide, including France, Belgium, Malaysia, Lebanon, United Kingdom, the United States, the Islamic Republic of Iran Broadcasting offers both domestic and foreign radio and television services, broadcasting 12 domestic television channels, 4 international news television channels, six satellite television channels for international audiences, and 30 provincial television channels available countrywide, half of which are broadcast in minority-status languages in Iran, for example Azerbaijani and Kurdish, as well as the local accents or dialects of Persian. The IRIB provides twelve radio stations for domestic audiences and through the IRIB World Service thirty radio stations are available for foreign and international audiences. It also publishes the Persian-language newspaper Jam-e Jam.

History

before 1979 revolution 
On 24 April 1940, Radio Iran was officially opened by Mohammad Reza Pahlavi –Iran crown prince at the time– and Isa Sedigh was the first head of it. the radio had five hours program a day and broadcast programs like domestic and foreign news, Iranian and western traditional music, religious and sports and also economic and political discussion. according to Statistical Centre of Iran estimates, in 1976 about 76% of urban population and 45% of rural population had access to the radio.

National Iranian Television officially opened on 21 March 1967 to create National Iranian Radio and Television. At that time hardware equipment was at Post ministry, Telegraph and Telephone disposal and its media was producing by Advertising and publishing department. In later years radio and television expansion request across the country to create an integrated entity and from 1971 all facilities was given to National Radio and Television. Shah personally appointed Reza Ghotbi in head of organization and the time of programs increased quickly. At the end of revolution two TV channel (first program and second program) was active and with facilities expansion, more than 95% of Urban population and about 75% of country population was able to receive TV waves. Before revolution about 40% of TV programs was foreign and also imported and internal programs were usually modeled from foreign programs.

During the 1979 revolution unrest and when Arteshbod Azhari became prime minister of Iran, Touraj Farazmand was chosen for head of National Iranian Radio and Television after Reza Ghotbi.

After 1979 revolution 
This organization expanded greatly after 1979 revolution and in addition to internal and global broadcasting channels, it benefits more than one hundred electronic information base and written media.

Broadcasting budget 4000 billion Toman expected in 2018 budget bill, however, according to Ali Asgari, (this organization manager) Just a channel budget like BBC Persian reaches more than 6000 billion Toman and Broadcasting needs more budget for manage 62 TV channels and 83 radio channels.

Sign

Sign of Islamic Republic of Iran Broadcasting 
Broadcasting sign includes Islamic Republic of Iran sign at the top and two words «لا» in Arabic; Shia font used for creating this sign. When this sign created at the beginning of the revolution, it was a sign of «say no» to Western and East countries or specifically United States and Soviet Union. These two words at the middle get together like a channel and there is an eye sign at the intersection of them. At the bottom of the sign, Islamic Republic of Iran phrase is written in Nastaliq font in Persian language.

IRIB's place in Iran's civil code 

According to Article 175 of the Iranian. constitution,
 The freedom of expression and dissemination of thoughts in the Radio and Television of the Islamic Republic of Iran must be guaranteed in keeping with the Islamic criteria and the best interests of the country.
 The appointment and dismissal of the head of the Radio and Television of the Islamic Republic of Iran rest with the Leader. A council consisting of two representatives each of the President, the head of the judiciary branch, and the Islamic Consultative Assembly, the Iranian parliament shall supervise the functioning of this organization.
 The policies and the manner of managing the organization and its supervision will be determined by law.

Prior to the 1979 Iranian Revolution, IRIB was known as National Iranian Radio and Television (NIRT).

The constitution further specifies that the director of the organization is chosen directly by the Supreme Leader for five years, and the head of the judiciary branch, the president, and the Islamic Consultative Assembly oversee the organization. The first director after the 1979 Revolution was Sadeq Qotbzadeh. The current director is Peyman Jebelli. The previous directors included Abdulali Ali-Asghari, Mohammad Sarafraz, Ezzatollah Zarghami, Ali Larijani and Mohammad Hashemi Rafsanjani. The Sima Festival is a TV productions contest sponsored annually by IRIB organization for the best producers, directors, actors and directors in multiple categories.

Facts about IRIB 

 IRIB has branches in 20 countries worldwide, including France, India, Belgium, Malaysia, UK, the United States, and broadcasts in more than 30 languages.
 IRIB broadcasts 12 national television channels, 4 international news television channels, 6 satellite television channels for international viewers, and 30 provincial television channels all around Iran. Fifty percent of those 30 provincial channels use the local accent or dialect. The IRIB provides twelve major radio stations as well, and an international service. IRIB has 27 world service channels.
 IRIB also has Arabic, Hindi, English, French and Spanish channels, besides the native Persian.
 Total number of employees: 13,000 to 50,000
 45.5% of Iran's youth report trust news broadcast by the Islamic Republic of Iran Broadcasting (IRIB).
Total budget of IRIB is about $0.9–1 billion which is maintained by advertisement and governmental budget.

Affiliates 
 Jam-e Jam is the official organ of the IRIB organization.
 IRIB News Department is a news agency affiliated to the IRIB organization.
 IRIB has a movie production company, called Sima Film.
 IRIB also outsources media production to numerous privately owned domestic media companies.
 TAKTA Co. produces technical equipment such as transmission and switching systems for IRIB
 Soroush Rasaneh Co. IT & ICT Company related to IRIB which provides IPTV services and it has 26 branch offices in Iran.
 Soroush Multimedia Co. provides CD/DVD of IRIB programs and holds some special short term education in 31 offices all over provinces of Iran.
 IRIB Pension Fund Co. is the holding company of 17 companies related to IRIB, such as Soroush Multimedia Co., Soroush Rasaneh Co., and TAKTA CO.
IRIB University  provides some courses related to media
 IRIB Research Center is responsible for research in the social and religious fields related to media.
 IRIB Media Trade, known before as Cima Media Int'l, is the sole representative of IRIB in the distribution of its productions (documentaries, feature films, TV series, telefilms and animations) as well as program acquisition for local IRIB TV channels.
 IRIB HD was a television channel run by IRIB. It was one of the recent television channels in Iran and was launched on June 15, 2014. This channel was a channel for test HD broadcasting. At 25 January 2016, it was removed in Tehran and replaced by provincial channel IRIB Tehran, as IRIB TV5 has been national.

Directors-general 
The director-general of IRIB is Peyman Jebelli, who was appointed by the Supreme Leader of Iran in 2021.

Controversies

Allegations of false confessions 
A study published in June 2020 by the Justice for Iran and the International Federation for Human Rights said Iranian television had broadcast the potentially coerced confessions of 355 detainees since 2010. Former prisoners stated they had been beaten and received threats of sexual violence as a means for their false testimonies to be delivered for use by the country's broadcasters.

Censorship of reformists 
IRIB, along with other Iranian state-run media tend to censor or silence voices or opinions of reformist politicians as well ridicule them even as the reformists are in power since most of his editorial bias is more closed to the Ayatollah and the Principlist.

International sanctions

United States 
Pursuant to the United States Presidential Executive Order 13628, the Islamic Republic of Iran Broadcasting is subjected to U.S. sanctions under Iran Threat Reduction and Syria Human Rights Act which gives the Treasury Department the authority to designate those in Iran who restrict or deny the free flow of information to or from the Iranian people.

European Union 

IRIB was placed in the list of sanctioned entities of the European Union in December 2022 due to its role in the repression of the Mahsa Amini protests. Following this order, Eutelsat ceased broadcasts of the IRIB international channels for the Europe region via Hot Bird satellite on 21 December 2022.

See also

 IRIB International Conference Center
 Media of Iran
 Censorship in Iran

References

External links 

  
 Official website for IRIB's domestic radio services 
 Official website for IRIB's domestic television services 
 Multilingual website of IRIB World Service

 
1926 establishments in Iran
Iranian propaganda organisations
Radio stations established in 1926
Television channels and stations established in 1958
News agencies based in Iran
Television stations in Iran
Persian-language television stations
Radio stations in Iran
Sanctions against Iran
Multilingual broadcasters
Persian-language radio stations
Iranian entities subject to the U.S. Department of the Treasury sanctions
Organisations under the direct control of the Supreme Leader of Iran